The Stadium Shah Alam LRT station is a light rapid transit (LRT) station that will serve the suburb of Section 13 of Shah Alam in Selangor, Malaysia. It serves as one of the stations on the Shah Alam line. The station will be built nearby Shah Alam Stadium car park. The station will be a main route to Shah Alam Stadium, Management and Science University (MSU) campus and AEON Mall Shah Alam.

Surrounding Areas
 Stadium Shah Alam
 Stadium Tertutup Malawati
 AEON Mall Shah Alam
 Giant Hypermarket Stadium Shah Alam & GCH Retail HQ
 Management & Science University
 TTDI Sentralis
 IJN-SelGate Specialist Hospital
 Menara U Apartment
 Arte Subang West Residential
 Pangsapuri Perdana

External links
 LRT3 Bandar Utama–Klang line

Rapid transit stations in Selangor
Shah Alam Line